RAB7, member RAS oncogene family-like 1 is a protein that in humans is encoded by the RAB7L1 gene. The gene is also known as RAB7L. RAB7L1 encodes a small GTP-binding protein and is a member of the Ras superfamily.

Model organisms

Model organisms have been used in the study of RAB7L1 function. A conditional knockout mouse line, called Rab7l1tm1a(EUCOMM)Wtsi was generated as part of the International Knockout Mouse Consortium program — a high-throughput mutagenesis project to generate and distribute animal models of disease to interested scientists — at the Wellcome Trust Sanger Institute.

Male and female animals underwent a standardized phenotypic screen to determine the effects of deletion. Twenty one tests were carried out on mutant mice, but no significant abnormalities were observed.

References

Further reading 
 

Human proteins
Genes mutated in mice